The 1859 United Kingdom general election in Ireland produced the last overall victory for the Conservatives in Ireland. They won a majority of seats on the island despite the Liberals receiving over 60% of the vote; this was partly due to a disproportionately large number of Conservative candidates standing unopposed. The franchise was restricted to the middle and upper classes.

Electoral reform in subsequent decades saw something of a rise in the Tory vote in Ireland accompanied by a diminution in the number of seats the party won. This was again due in some degree to the relative numbers of candidates standing unopposed for the two parties.

Results

See also
 History of Ireland (1801–1923)

References

1859
General election
Ireland
April 1859 events
May 1859 events
1850s elections in Ireland